Harvey B. Sathre (February 23, 1920 – November 19, 2013) was an American farmer and politician.

Born in Austin, Minnesota, Sathre served in the United States Army during World War II. Sathre was a dairy farmer. From 1963 to 1973, Sathre served in the Minnesota House of Representatives. In 1980, Sathre served as Mayor of Adams, Minnesota. He died at his home in Adams, Minnesota.

Notes

1920 births
2013 deaths
People from Austin, Minnesota
Military personnel from Minnesota
Farmers from Minnesota
Mayors of places in Minnesota
Members of the Minnesota House of Representatives
People from Mower County, Minnesota
United States Army personnel of World War II